The Little Salmon River is a tributary of Lake Ontario located in Oswego County, New York.

The river was known by the Iroquois as Cas-son-ta-che-go-na, translated as "river of great bark" or "large pieces of bark lying down, ready for building". In addition to its current name, the stream was historically known as Salmon Creek or Little Salmon Creek. The current name was officially adopted by the United States Board on Geographic Names in 1905.

Course
The Little Salmon River drains an approximately  watershed, which is primarily agricultural and residential in nature.

The river rises at the confluence of the North Branch Little Salmon River and South Branch Little Salmon River in the eastern part of the town of Mexico, west of the village of Parish. From there, the river flows northwest through the village of Mexico and the hamlet of Texas before emptying into Lake Ontario at Mexico Point.

Sportfishing
The lower Little Salmon River provides habitat for a variety of resident fish species, including brown bullhead, white suckers, rock bass, largemouth bass, and northern pike. In addition, several lake-dwelling species enter the Little Salmon River during annual spawning runs in the fall, including Chinook salmon, coho salmon, steelhead, and brown trout. In 2015, 3,410  steelhead were stocked in the river by the New York State Department of Environmental Conservation.

The majority of the river is privately owned, and fishing access to the river is limited to Mexico Point State Park and the Mexico Point Boat Launch, both located near the mouth of the Little Salmon River.

See also
List of rivers of New York

References

Rivers of New York (state)
Tributaries of Lake Ontario
Rivers of Oswego County, New York